Lanthanolania (meaning "forgotten butcher") is an extinct genus of diapsid from Middle Permian (Wordian stage, or uppermost Kazanian in Eastern Europe) deposits of Arkhangel'sk Province, Russia. It is known from the holotype and only specimen PIN 162/56, a nearly complete skull from the Glyadnaya Shchelya locality, Mezen river in Mesen District. It was first named by Sean P. Modesto and Robert R. Reisz in 2003 and the type species is Lanthanolania ivakhnenkoi.

Phylogeny 
Cladogram after Reisz, Modesto & Scott, 2011:

References

Permian reptiles of Europe
Fossil taxa described in 2003
Prehistoric neodiapsids
Prehistoric reptile genera